A European Authorised Representative (E.A.R.) serves as a legal entity designated by non European Union (EU) manufacturers, to represent them in the EU and ensure their compliance with the European Directives. The CE certificate and declaration of conformity can only be issued by a company located in the European Union.

Overview 

Regulation of goods produced by manufactures outside of the European Union, especially in the medical devices industry, instigated the need for Authorised Representatives. As clarified in the Medical Devices Directive amendment (93/42/EEC), it is required that alongside the CE mark all products must also have an Authorised Representative. As stated in this amendment, an Authorised Representative should serve as a contact point with the EU member states competent authorities. Medical Device Regulation (MDR) and in vitro diagnostic Medical Device Regulation ([Regulation_(EU)_2017/746]) increases obligations of E.A.R in the field of surveillance of medical devices.

An E.A.R. holds the responsibility to act as a neutral party between the competent authorities and the non EU manufacturers. They must ensure the manufacturer's compliance with the conformity assessment procedure set out in the European directives which apply to the manufacture's product. The EAR must uphold dual accountability with the manufactures if problems or questions arise regarding the product. The E.A.R. must provide their contact information for the manufacturer to place on the products, allowing the E.A.R. to be the primary contact for EU authorities. The E.A.R. is the entity to which the authorities and institutions of the EU Member States may address the obligations set out in the legal requirements for medical devices. An authorised representative may also carry out a conformity assessment of a medical device on behalf of the manufacturer.

European ‘Blue Guide" describes that delegation of an authorised representative should be set out in writing (as an agreement, mandate, or power of attorney) to define contents and limits of tasks. The copy of the agreement should be sent for competent authorities upon request.

Duties of a European Authorised Representative 

An E.A.R. observes the manufacturers' compliance with the conformity assessment procedure set out in the European directives which apply to the product.

They ensure the law is met by having Class I medical devices registered with the Competent Authorities before being placed on the market.

They ensure their contact information is available to the manufactures to be placed on all the products they are representing, thus acting as a primary contact for the EU Authorities.

They must notify EU Authorities of all major incidents pertaining to products.

An E.A.R. must understand all EU regulations from each of the EU member states as well as the four European Free Trade Association (EFTA) states, and provide notification of changes and amendments to directives that affect individual products.

They must keep the product's technical file available at any time for the EU member states authorities and maintain confidentiality with manufacturer's sensitive product information, releasing them only to the appropriate authorities when called upon.

See also 
CE Mark
Directive (European Union)
European Union Legal System
Regulation (European Union)
List of European Union directives
Medical Devices Directive
Medical Devices Regulation (MDR)
In Vitro Diagnostic Medical Devices Regulation (IVDR)

References 

GUIDELINE FOR AUTHORISED REPRESENTATIVES

http://ec.europa.eu/health/medical-devices/files/meddev/2_5_10_ol_en.pdf

European Union law
European Union legal terminology